The 1922 Iowa gubernatorial election was held on November 7, 1922. Incumbent Republican Nathan E. Kendall defeated Democratic nominee J.R. Files with 70.54% of the vote.

General election

Candidates
Nathan E. Kendall, Republican
J.R. Files, Democratic

Results

References

1922
Iowa
Gubernatorial